Michael Deeley (born 6 August 1932) is an Academy Award-winning British film producer known for such motion pictures as The Italian Job (1969), The Deer Hunter (1978), and Blade Runner (1982). He is also a founding member and Honorary President of British Screen Forum.

Biography

Deeley's father was a director at McCann Erickson advertising agency, and his mother was a PA to several film producers. He attended Stowe School in Buckinghamshire. After national service in Malaysia during the time of the Malayan Emergency, Deeley gained a job through his mother's connections as an assistant editor at a company run by Douglas Fairbanks, Jr.

While editing the TV show The Adventures of Robin Hood, with his editing partner Harry Booth, the two men decided to branch into a producing partnership. They raised funds to produce a 26-minute short starring Peter Sellers and Spike Milligan, The Case of the Mukkinese Battle Horn (1956). This launched Deeley's producing career, although he did not give up his day job as editor for a few years.

In the early 1960s, Deeley worked for the UK sales arm of MCA Universal for three years, then he returned to producing with Sandy the Reluctant Nudist (1963, released 1966) and One Way Pendulum (1964). The latter was made for Woodfall Film Productions who hired Deeley in 1964 to assist Oscar Lewenstein, a director of the company.

Deeley produced Robbery (1967), which began a partnership with Stanley Baker to make films through Oakhurst Productions. Along with Baker and Barry Spikings, Deeley also established a series of companies all called "Great Western" which did a variety of activities, including music festivals (Great Western Festivals), and investments (Great Western Investments). Great Western Investments later took over British Lion Films in 1973, and Deeley was appointed managing director of that company.

While at British Lion, Deeley oversaw the release of Don't Look Now (1973) and The Wicker Man (1973), and helped finance The Internecine Project, Who?, Ransom (all 1974) and Conduct Unbecoming (1975). He also produced The Man Who Fell to Earth (1976).

In 1976, after British Lion merged with EMI Films, Deeley and Spikings took over management of that company. They oversaw a series of mostly successful films including Convoy, The Driver, Death on the Nile, Warlords of Atlantis and The Deer Hunter (all 1978).

Deeley left the company in 1979 and produced Blade Runner (1982).

In 1984 Deeley was appointed CEO of Consolidated, a TV company seeking to further expand into US network television.

Selected filmography

The Adventures of Robin Hood (TV series) – editor
The Case of the Mukkinese Battle Horn (1956) (short) – producer
 At the Stroke of Nine (1957) – producer, writer
The Buccaneers (1958) (TV series) – editor
OSS (1959) (TV series) – editor
Tremor (1961) – producer
Crosstrap (1962)
Sandy the Reluctant Nudist (1963)
 One Way Pendulum (1964)
The Knack ...and How to Get It (1965) – executive producer
Robbery (1967) – producer
Red, White and Zero (1967) – associate producer
The White Bus (1967) – producer
Ride of the Valkyrie (1967) (short) – associate producer
 The Other People (1968) – executive producer
The Long Day's Dying (1968) – executive producer
Where's Jack? (1969) – executive producer
The Italian Job (1969) – producer
Murphy's War (1971) – producer
Conduct Unbecoming (1975) – producer
The Man Who Fell to Earth (1976) – producer
Convoy (1978) – executive producer
 The Deer Hunter (1978) – producer
 Blade Runner (1982) – producer
 Finnegan Begin Again (1985) (TV movie) – executive producer
 Deceptions (1985) (TV movie) – executive producer
 A Gathering of Old Men (1987) (TV movie) – executive producer
 The Secret Life of Archie's Wife (TV movie) – executive producer
 Young Catherine (1990) (TV movie) – executive producer

Unmade Films
The Last Gun (1979) – Western from Walter Hill
The Chinese Bandit (1978) – based on script by David Shaber

References

Sources
Michael Deeley, Blade Runners, Deer Hunters and Blowing the Bloody Doors Off: My Life in Cult Movies, Pegasus Books, 2009.

External links

1932 births
Living people
Film producers from London
Producers who won the Best Picture Academy Award
Place of birth missing (living people)